The following is the squad list for the 2019 OFC U-19 Women's Championship. Each squad consisted of 20 players in total, 2 of whom had to be goalkeepers.

Group A

Head coach: Tuka Tisam

The final squad was announced on 30 August.

Head coach: Sunil Kumar

The final squad was announced on 30 August.

Head coach: Patrick Miniti

The final squad was announced on 30 August.

Head coach: Jean Robert Yelou

The final squad was announced on 30 August.

Group B

Head coach:  Steve Settle

The final squad was announced on 31 August.

Head coach:  Gemma Lewis

The final squad was announced on 6 August.

Head coach: Lanuola Mulipola

The final squad was announced on 31 August.

Head coach: Stéphanie Spielmann

The final squad was announced on 31 August.

Group C

Head coach: Coralie Bretegnier

The final squad was announced on 30 August.

Head coach: Rachel Wadunah

The final squad was announced on 30 August.

Head coach: Lafaele Moala

References

External links
Official site at OFC.com

OFC U-19 Women's Championship
Association football women's tournament squads